Zhu Lilan (born August 1935) is a Chinese politician who served as minister of science and technology from 1998 to 2001 and chairperson of the National People's Congress Education, Science, Culture and Public Health Committee from 2003 to 2008.

Zhu was an alternate member of the 14th Central Committee of the Chinese Communist Party and a member of the 15th Central Committee of the Chinese Communist Party. She was a member of the Standing Committee of the 9th and 10th National People's Congress.

Biography
Zhu was born in Shanghai in August 1935, while her ancestral home in Wuxing County (now Huzhou), Zhejiang. After graduating from McTyeire School in 1955, she was sent to study at Odessa University on government scholarships. She returned to China in 1961 and successively served as research team leader, deputy director of the office, deputy research director, associate researcher, and director of the Institute of Chemistry, Chinese Academy of Sciences. She was a visiting scholar at the University of Freiburg from 1979 to 1980.

Zhu joined the Chinese Communist Party (CCP) in July 1956, and got involved in politics in 1986, when she was appointed executive deputy director of the National Technical Committee. During his term in office, she headed the 863 Program, a program funded and administered by the government of the People's Republic of China intended to stimulate the development of advanced technologies in a wide range of fields for the purpose of rendering China independent of financial obligations for foreign technologies. In March 1998, she was promoted to become minister of science and technology, a position she held until February 2001. In February 2001, she became deputy chairperson of the National People's Congress Education, Science, Culture and Public Health Committee, rising to chairperson in March 2008.

Honours and awards
 August 1997 Fellow of the International Eurasian Academy of Sciences

References

1935 births
Living people
Odesa University alumni
Scientists from Shanghai
20th-century Chinese women politicians
21st-century Chinese women politicians
21st-century Chinese politicians
People's Republic of China politicians from Shanghai
Chinese Communist Party politicians from Shanghai
Alternate members of the 14th Central Committee of the Chinese Communist Party
Members of the 15th Central Committee of the Chinese Communist Party
Members of the Standing Committee of the 9th National People's Congress
Members of the Standing Committee of the 10th National People's Congress